Calycoseris is a small genus of two species of annual desert wildflowers in the family Asteraceae, native to western North America in the southwestern United States and Northwestern Mexico. They are characterized by the tack-shaped gland hairs on their upper stems and bracts, the trait which gives them the common name tackstem. The two species of tackstem are the yellow tackstem, Calycoseris parryi and the white tackstem, Calycoseris wrightii.

References

External links
Jepson Manual Treatment of Calycoseris
USDA Plants Profile for Calycoseris

 
Asteraceae genera
Flora of Northwestern Mexico
Flora of the Southwestern United States
Flora of California
Taxa named by Asa Gray